Krzysztof Sitkowski (21 November 1935 – 4 February 1988) was a Polish basketball player. He competed in the men's tournament at the 1960 Summer Olympics and the 1964 Summer Olympics.

References

1935 births
1988 deaths
Polish men's basketball players
Olympic basketball players of Poland
Basketball players at the 1960 Summer Olympics
Basketball players at the 1964 Summer Olympics
Basketball players from Warsaw